Representations or analogues of one or more of the nine Muses of Greek mythology have appeared in many different modern fictional works.

The list of Muses comprises:

 Calliope, the Muse of epic poetry 
 Clio, the Muse of history
 Erato, the Muse of love poetry
 Euterpe, the Muse of music
 Melpomene, the Muse of tragedy
 Polyhymnia, the Muse of hymns
 Terpsichore, the Muse of dance
 Thalia, the Muse of comedy
 Urania/Ourania, the Muse of astronomy

The Nine Muses

Literature
 The Muses are mentioned several times throughout Rick Riordan's mythological series: Percy Jackson and the Olympians, Heroes of Olympus and The Trials of Apollo.

Popular music
In 2010, a South Korean all-female idol group debuted under the name 'Nine Muses'.

Film and television
In the anime series Love Live! School Idol Project, the musical group, μ's, is named after the Muses, and there are nine members, just as there are nine Muses.
In the anime series Kiddy Grade, several sister ships to those of the main characters are named for Muses including Calliope, Clio, Terpsichore, Erato, Euterpe, Thalia, and Polyhymnia.
 In the 2017 film Muse, a writer is inspired by several Muses.
 In the writing of the 2019 film Uncut Gems, Julia Fox was Josh Safdie's muse.
 In "Muse to My Ear", a 2001 season 4 episode of the television supernatural drama Charmed, the Charmed Ones must protect the Muses from a warlock who is trapping them into a magical ring.
 The 1980 film Xanadu, a fantasy musical revolving around Terpsichore inspiring an artist and a businessman to create a roller-skating rink/disco, stars Olivia Newton-John and, in his last film appearance, Gene Kelly.

Calliope

Literature

The Muse Calliope is a character in the graphic novel Sandman, by Neil Gaiman. Her story, "Calliope" is in the 1990 trade paperback Dream Country. According to the comic's canon, Calliope was the youngest (rather than the eldest) Muse as well as a one-time lover of Dream, by whom she bore Orpheus.
A character from Homestuck is named Calliope, since they are a "Muse of Space".

Film and television
 Calliope features in the 1997 Walt Disney Pictures film Hercules, appearing alongside the Muses Clio, Melpomene, Terpsichore, and Thalia, who collectively serve as a Greek chorus. The tallest of the five, Calliope sometimes acts as de facto leader and spokeswoman for the others. She was voiced by Tony Award winner Lillias White, who reprised the role in the subsequent TV series.
 In the 2002 episode "Out of Sync" from the animated series Cyberchase, Calliope plays her lyre and she is one of the four Mount Olympus band members with Apollo the Greek god of music (who plays the gong), Himaropa the siren (who plays the French horn), and the Beast (who plays the drums).
 In the 2014 season 10 episode of Supernatural, "Fan Fiction", Calliope appears as the antagonist.
 In the 2022 Netflix series The Sandman, Calliope is played by Greek-Canadian actress Melissanthi Mahut.

Clio 
In Batman: The Animated Series, Clio is the name of criminal mastermind Maxie Zeus's girlfriend and assistant. Maxie suffers from a god complex, believing that he is the Greek god Zeus and that his girlfriend is the same name Muse of History.
The Cleo of Alpha Chi literary society at Trinity College is named after Clio.
Clio features in the 1997 Walt Disney Pictures film Hercules, appearing alongside the muses Calliope, Melpomene, Terpsichore and Thalia, who collectively serve as a Greek chorus. She was voiced by Vanéese Y. Thomas, who reprised the role in the subsequent TV series.
Clio (also known as "Kira") is the lead character in the 2007 musical Xanadu, which is based on the 1980 film of the same name.  She was played by Kerry Butler in the original Broadway production.
The muse Clio is a character in Piers Anthony's Xanth series. She features as the protagonist in the 2004 book Currant Events.
The muse Clio is a main supporting character in Jodi Taylor's The Chronicles of St. Mary's series – using the name "Mrs. Partridge" as a cover while working as the personal assistant to Dr. Bairstowe. Her true identity as Clio is known only by the series protagonist Dr. Maxwell.                                     
Several Muses are the focus of the 2007 musical Xanadu, which is based on the 1980 film of the same name. The story revolves around Clio, who is played by Kerry Butler.
In the 2017 film Wonder Woman, Wonder Woman refers to Clio as the name of the author of the 12 volumes of Treatises on Bodily Pleasure.

Erato
Erato is a character in the 2007 musical Xanadu, which is based on the 1980 film of the same name.  She was played by Kenita R. Miller in the original Broadway production.

Euterpe 
 In the anime series Guilty Crown, main character Inori Yuzuriha is best known for her song "Euterpe".
 Euterpe is one of the 50 Spacer worlds in Isaac Asimov's Robot Series. It features a small moon called Gemstone.
 In a cantata by Strozzi Barbara, the composer puts her songs around the muse.

Melpomene 
Melpomene features in the 1997 Walt Disney Pictures film Hercules, appearing alongside the muses Calliope, Clio, Terpsichore and Thalia, who collectively serve as a Greek chorus. She was voiced by Broadway actress Cheryl Freeman, who reprised the role in the subsequent TV series.
Melpomene is a character in the 2007 musical Xanadu, which is based on the 1980 film of the same name.  She was played by Mary Testa in the original Broadway production.
Melpomene is a main character in the French novella Anathemae by Emilio Bouzamondo. She is the origin of the tragedy of the main characters. She appears with a billy goat at her side.
Melpomene is a song by The Dear Hunter from the 2016 album Act V: Hymns with the Devil in Confessional.

Polyhymnia

Polyhymnia is one of the main characters in the 1955 Tom Puss story De Muzenis.
The protagonist of Madeleine L'Engle's Polly O'Keefe novels is named after the muse Polyhymnia.

Terpsichore

Literature
In Daniel Quinn's 1997 novel My Ishmael, the fictional planet Terpsichore is a land ravished by dancing, with dancing paralleling the rise of agriculture on Earth. Dancing (in an unspecified manner) speeds up the growth of the natives' "favorite foods".

Film and television
The muse Terpsichore is the protagonist in the 1947 film Down to Earth. She is portrayed by Rita Hayworth.
"Terpsichorean" was a popular adjective in Victorian music hall hyperbole. The long-running BBC TV series The Good Old Days recreated this style, with Leonard Sachs playing a compère with a notable fondness for the word, and in the Monty Python Cheese Shop sketch, John Cleese's character denies complaining about the music with the line "Heaven forbid. I am one who delights in all manifestations of the Terpsichorean muse."
In the 1980 film Xanadu, Olivia Newton-John plays Kira, another version of Terpsichore, the muse of dancing and chorus, who inspires an artist Michael Beck and his bandleader friend Gene Kelly to open a nightclub.
 Terpsichore is mentioned in master poet Tony Harrison's 1992 Film-Poem The Gaze of the Gorgon: 'Terpsichore, the Muse who sees, her dances done by amputees'
Terpsichore features in the 1997 Walt Disney Pictures film Hercules, appearing alongside the muses Calliope, Clio, Melpomene and Thalia, who collectively serve as a Greek chorus. She was voiced by Tony Award winner LaChanze, who reprised the role in the subsequent TV series. She had a prominent role in the episode Hercules and the Muse of Dance, where she teaches him to dance so he can pass in phys ed and be a better hero.
In the 1998 anime series Cowboy Bebop, two characters take their names from the muse: Valeria Terpsichore and her unseen, but alluded to, husband Ural Terpsichore.

Theater
Terpsichore is a character in the 2007 musical Xanadu, which is based on the 1980 film of the same name.  Her part is always played by a man in drag. She was played by Andre Ward in the original Broadway production.

Thalia 
The comic mask of Thalia featured in each title card of every Three Stooges short produced from the 1945 Idiots Deluxe until their final one in 1959, Sappy Bull Fighters.  
Thalia features in the 1997 Walt Disney Pictures film Hercules, appearing alongside the muses Calliope, Clio, Melpomene and Terpsichore, who collectively serve as a Greek chorus. Portrayed as short and plump, she has the deepest voice amongst the five Muses depicted, and true to nature, makes the funniest comments. She was voiced by Roz Ryan, who reprised the role in the subsequent TV series.
In a 2003 Static Shock episode "Hard as Nails", Harley Quinn uses the alias "Thalia".
Thalia is a character in the 2007 musical Xanadu, which is based on the 1980 film of the same name.  Her part is always played by a man in drag. She was played by Curtis Holbrook in the original Broadway production.
The German bookstore chain Thalia is named after the muse.
The Muse of Comedy was in the last episode of season two of The Mr. Peabody and Sherman Show, only it was a grotesque man named Phillip.

See also
 The Muses (1578 painting by Tintoretto)

References

Classical mythology in popular culture
Greek and Roman deities in fiction
Greek Muses